Crazy 8s is an American rock and ska band from Oregon.

History

Formation and first album
The Crazy 8s were formed in Corvallis, Oregon as "The Cheeks" in 1982. However, because a UK band had already used this name, the band changed its name to "The Sweet Cheeks." During their earliest days, they were notorious for their raucous frat house party gigs and mostly covered songs by their favorite bands. Later in 1982, Todd Duncan, former sax player of Eugene rock band "The Sneakers", proposed that The Sweet Cheeks open for Billy Rancher and the Unreal Gods at La Bamba's in Portland. The month before the gig, Todd changed the name of the band to "Crazy 8s" and added several new songs to the band's lineup. The members of the newly monikered group were noticed by Tony DeMicoli, the owner of La Bamba's, during their performance and he hired the band to perform in the upcoming months. In addition, Crazy 8s became a regular opening act for Billy Rancher's band.

The band opened for Romeo Void at Oregon State on October 5, 1982 and with The English Beat at the University of Oregon the same year. In Rolling Stone magazine, the Crazy 8s were defined as one of "nine bands to watch" In addition, the Crazy 8s played alongside several well-known bands such as The Clash, the Violent Femmes, Red Hot Chili Peppers, Sonic Youth, The Three O'Clock, and the Beach Boys between 1984 and 1985.

In order to release their 1983 debut album, Law and Order, the band formed their own record label titled "RedRum Records". Not having the financial means to fund such an endeavor, the Crazy 8s turned to Joe Johnson's brother, Steve Johnson, an Oregon State University and NBA player, who invested $8,000 in the recording, production and distribution of the album. The band rejected offers from several major labels, including Warner Brothers. After the release of the hit single "Johnny Q", the band's album reached the "Top 20" on the Gavin Report.

Reception
The Crazy 8s were written up in several newspapers, magazines and other news sources, including Rolling Stone Other, The Oregonian, The Rocket, The Seattle Times, The Chicago Sun-Times, the Scene Magazine, ISU Daily, The Varsity, Two Louies, This Week, The Corvallis Gazette-Times, The Mast, Billboard and Willamette Week.

Greg Barbrick, a British writer for The Rocket, wrote:

For Barbrick, Crazy 8s was a group that deserved to be "international sensations." In another issue of The Rocket, released not long after the Rolling Stone article, he wrote that:

However, Crazy 8s did not break into mainstream pop culture.

The Crazy 8s were the only independent release to have a song to reach number 69 (or higher) in Tower Record's Pulse Chainwide Sales Chart. Their 1985 song "Touchy Situation" reached the #6 position at CFNY (Toronto) and #13 at Z100 (Portland, Oregon).

Founding members
"Tasty" Phil Allen, tenor saxophone
Todd Duncan, lead vocals and alto saxophone. - played in The Sneakers, from Eugene, Oregon in 1979 to 1982.
Bruce Marler, trumpet
Casey "Spacey" Shaar, keyboard.
Malcolm "Sweet Pity" Smith, bass guitar
Tim "The Fat Man" Tubb, trombone. - wrote the piece "Johnny Q."
Mark "Wah-Wah" Wanaka, guitar.
Rick Washington, drums.
Gary "The Warehouse" Williams, percussion

Additional members
(listed chronologically)
Joe Johnson, tenor saxophone.
Jim Wallace, bass guitar, also played in seminal Portland bands, (i.e. The Odds, 2:50, Map of France, Theatre of Sheep)
Mike Regan, bass guitar currently employed at Gordon Russell Middle School as the band director.
Carl Smith, percussion, currently working with renowned concert violinist Aaron Meyer
Dan Schauffler, tenor saxophone, flute, keyboard originally a member of the band Nu Shooz.
Jerry Burton, tenor sax, replaced Danny and was on the 10th anniversary reissue of "Law and Order."
Ron Regan, keyboards and alto sax
Lance Kreiter, drums, replaced Howard Clarke in 1993 and was in the band through the NYE show of 1994/1995 at Key Largo. Rejoined in August 2014.

Discography
1984 - Law and Order.
1985 - Nervous in Suburbia.
1987 - Out of the Way.
1988 - Big Live Nut Pack.
1989 - Doggapotamus World.
1992 - Law and Order re-release .
1992 - Still Crazy After All These Beers.

All albums were released under the Crazy 8s' official label, RedRum Records.

Awards and honors
Player of the Year Award:
1987 - Dan Schauffler (Two Louies)
Horn Player of the Year Award, The Crystal Award:
1992 - Tim Tubb.
Oregon Music Hall of Fame:
2007 Crazy 8's.

Billboard Hits
1984 - Law and Order (College Media Journal)
1984 - "Johnny Q." (Screamer of the Week for WLIR)
1985 - Nervous in Suburbia (#69, Pulse Chainwide Sales Chart)
1985 - "Touchy Situation" (#6, CFNY Station)
1985 - "Touchy Situation" (#13, Z100 Portland)

References

Musical groups established in 1982
American ska musical groups
Rock music groups from Oregon
1982 establishments in Oregon
1994 disestablishments in Oregon
Musicians from Corvallis, Oregon
Musical groups disestablished in 1994